The Shurtan gas field is a natural gas field and Natural gas condensate in Uzbekistan. The total proven reserves of the Shurtan gas field are around 24 trillion cubic feet (686 km3), and production is slated to be around 479 Million cubic feet/day (13.7×105m3) in 2013.

References

Natural gas fields in Uzbekistan
Natural gas fields in the Soviet Union